Mac Robertson may refer to:
 Macpherson Robertson
 Mac. Robertson Land
 Mac.Robertson Girls' High School
 MacRobertson Air Race

See also
 MacRobertson's